Leopoldo Alas Mínguez (4 September 1962 in Arnedo – 1 August 2008 in Madrid) was a Spanish writer, poet and editor. He was the grand nephew of Leopoldo Alas "Clarin".

He studied in Italian philology, and was one of the most important authors of homosexual literature in Spain. Between 1987 and 1992 he directed Signos Magazine, which he founded together with Luis Cremades and Daniel Garbade, publishing important poetry by Rafael Alberti, Rainer Maria Rilke, Vicente Molina Foix. Since 1986 he had written numerous articles for magazines and newspapers.

Novels 
 Bochorno (1991)
 El extraño caso de Gaspar Ganijosa (2001)
 A través de un espejo oscuro (2005)
 La loca aventura de vivir (obra póstuma, 2009)

Poetry 
 Los palcos (1988)
 La condición y el tiempo Editor.Huerga y Fierro editores col. Signos, 1992, 
 La posesión del miedo (1996)
 El triunfo del vacío (2004)
 Concierto del desorden (2007)
 Nostalgia de siglos y Con estas mismas distancias (2011)

Theatre 
 Última toma (1985)
 La pasión de madame Artú (1992)
 Sin demonio no hay fortuna (1987). LibRadioreto of an ópera.
 Estamos en el aire (1991). Libreto of an ópera.

Catalogues 
He published texts for catalogues and art publications about different artists, as for Swiss artist Daniel Garbade, in Cóctel, published by El Wisli, 1996, together with by de José Saramago, Rafael Alberti, Jesús Ferrero, Vicente Molina Foix.a Foix 
 Catalogue "Coctel" Toledo 1996,

Radio 
Starting septiembre 2004 until his death, Leopoldo Alas conducted the programa Entiendas o no entiendas at Radio 5, Radio Nacional de Espana

References

20th-century Spanish poets
20th-century Spanish male writers
21st-century Spanish poets
Gay poets
Spanish LGBT poets
Spanish male poets
1962 births
2008 deaths
People from Arnedo
21st-century Spanish male writers
20th-century Spanish LGBT people
Spanish magazine founders